The Miller Plantation House is a historic mansion in Olive Branch, Mississippi. It was built in 1849 for William Lord Miller, a planter. It was designed in the Greek Revival architectural style, and its large size was unusual for its remote location. It has been listed on the National Register of Historic Places since July 15, 1982.

References

Houses on the National Register of Historic Places in Mississippi
National Register of Historic Places in DeSoto County, Mississippi
Greek Revival architecture in Mississippi
Houses completed in 1849
Plantation houses in Mississippi